Satgaon is a locality in eastern part of Guwahati surrounded by localities of Narengi, Noonmati and Patharquarry. Located in south east of city, it is thinly populated and less industrialised.

Education
Saint Francis de sales school, Kendriya Vidyalaya Narengi, Army School Narengi and Kendriya Vidyalaya Noonmaati are few nearby schools.

Other institutes
Satgaon Army Halt Station is located here.

Transport
It is well connected to rest of city with city buses and other private commercial vehicles.

See also
 Jalukbari
 Gandhinagar

References

  

Neighbourhoods in Guwahati